Beautiful Day in the Cold Cruel World is the debut studio album by American country music duo The Warren Brothers. It was released on October 27, 1998 via BNA Records. It includes the singles "Guilty," "Better Man" and "She Wants to Rock," all of which charted in the top 40 on the Billboard Hot Country Songs charts.

Pemberton Roach of Allmusic rated the album four stars out of five, comparing its sound to that of "slick, roots-influenced pop artists like Bruce Hornsby, Toad the Wet Sprocket and Glenn Frey" and saying that such a sound "avoid[s] any trace of Nashville clichés in favor of honest, straightforward lyrics and energetic, polished playing."

Track listing

Personnel 
Compiled from liner notes.

The Warren Brothers
Brad Warren — harmony vocals, acoustic guitar, electric guitar
Brett Warren — lead vocals, acoustic guitar, harmonica, mandolin

Additional musicians
 Dave Berg, Georgia Middleman, Marty McIntosh, and LeAnn Phelan — gang vocals on "Guilty"
 Bruce Bouton — pedal steel guitar, lap steel guitar
 Chris Farren — mandolin on "The Enemy" and "Just Another Sad Song"; keyboards on "Greyhound Bus" and "The Loneliest Girl in the World"
 Larry Franklin — fiddle
 John Hobbs — piano on "Greyhound Bus", "The One I Can't Live Without", and "Nowhere Fast"; accordion on "Nowhere Fast"
 Jeannie Hoeft — percussion
 Michael McDonald — harmony vocals on "Better Man"
 Marty McIntosh — bass guitar
 Greg Morrow — drums
 Rob Stoney — Hammond B-3 organ, piano
 The Warren Kids Family Choir — choir singing "He's Got the Whole World in His Hands" on "Cold Cruel World"

Technical
 Don Cobb — digital editing
 Chris Farren — production
 Steve Marcantonio — recording, overdubbing, mixing
 Denny Purcell — mastering

Chart performance

References

1998 debut albums
BNA Records albums
The Warren Brothers albums
Albums produced by Chris Farren (country musician)